Tommy Larkin's Gaelic Athletic Club is a Gaelic Athletic Association club located in the Ballinakill and Woodford areas of County Galway, Ireland which competes in the Galway Senior Hurling Championship.

History
Tommy Larkin's Gaelic Athletic Club was founded in 1968 with the amalgamation of both the Woodford and Ballinakill GAA clubs.

Soon after amalgamation adult hurling flourished with the senior team winning the county title in 1971. However despite the efforts of many tireless workers the club struggled to compete in the late seventies and eighties due in the most part to emigration.

In 1990 the club was relegated to the intermediate ranks, this prompted a renewed commitment to coaching at underage level. Since the nineties the club has been one of the strongest at underage level in the county with several titles at Under 12, Under 14, and Under 16, including two Féile titles.

Name 
The club is named after two local men, both named Thomas Larkin, who played separate yet significant roles in local history.

 Tom Larkin of Gurteeny, Woodford.

In 1886, during a week-long eviction at a premise known as Saunder's Fort in Woodford, Tom stood up to an RIC constable who was roughly treating a young girl and struck him. Tom was subsequently arrested and imprisoned in the overcrowded Kilkenny Gaol where he died of reported neglect in 1887 aged 23.

 Fr. Tom Larkin of Ballinakill.

Thought of locally as one of the most devoted lovers of all that was Irish: games, music and dancing. He fostered hurling in Ballinakill and in all East Galway when he was Chairman. Fr. Larkin played a leading part in G.A.A affairs in Co. Galway in the 1920s and 1930s and it was he who coached the great Tynagh teams which won ten Co. Galway senior championships and supplied the backbone of the Galway team which won the All-Ireland of 1923. He was also the founder of the Ballinakill Céilí Band. He died in 1949 aged 58.

Crest 
The club's current crest was designed by Albert Daniels, Drimkeary in 2004.

Achievements
 Connacht Senior Club Hurling Championship (1): 1971
 Galway Senior Club Hurling Championship (1): 1971
 Connacht Intermediate Club Hurling Championship Winners 2005, 2007

Notable people
Jason Flynn
Cyril Farrell

External links
Tommy Larkin's GAA site

References

Gaelic games clubs in County Galway
Hurling clubs in County Galway